Nationality words link to articles with information on the nation's poetry or literature (for instance, Irish or France).

Events
May - English poet John Milton sets out for a tour of the European continent. He spends the summer in Florence.

Works published

Great Britain
 Henry Adamson, Muses Threnodie: of Mirthful Mournings on the death of Mr Gall, Edinburgh, noted for giving a general description of Perth in the 17th century; published with the encouragement of Adamson's friend, William Drummond
 Charles Aleyn, The History of Henry the Seventh
 Richard Brathwaite, writing under the pen name "Corymboeus", Barnabees Journall, under the Names of Mirtilus & Faustulus Shadowed, Latin and English verse on facing pages
 Robert Chamberlain, Nocturnall Lucubrations; or, Meditations Divine and Morall
 William Davenant, Madagascar; with Other Poems
 Justa Edouardo King Naufrago, by various authors; a collection of elegies dedicated to the memory of Edward King, a college friend of John Milton's at Cambridge who had been drowned in August 1637 when his ship sank in the Irish Sea off the coast of Wales; including Milton's "Lycidas"
 Thomas Nabbes, The Springs of Glorie, verse drama
 Francis Quarles, Hieroglyphikes of the Life of Man
 Thomas Randolph, Poems with the Muses Looking-lasse: and Amyntas

Other
 Friedrich von Logau, Erstes Hundert Teutscher Reimen-Sprüche, epigrams, Germany

Births
Death years link to the corresponding "[year] in poetry" article:
 January 1 – Antoinette du Ligier de la Garde Deshoulières (died 1694), French poet
 January 24 – Charles Sackville, 6th Earl of Dorset (died 1706), English poet and courtier
 February 15 – Zeb-un-Nissa (Makhfi) (died 1702), Persian poet and Mughal princess

Deaths
Birth years link to the corresponding "[year] in poetry" article:
 February 24 – Charles Fitzgeoffrey (born 1576), English poet and clergyman
 February 25 – Sir Robert Aytoun (born 1570), Scottish poet
 June 25 – Juan Pérez de Montalbán (born 1602), Spanish priest, dramatist, poet and novelist
 August 27 – John Hoskins (born 1566), English poet, classicist, judge and politician
 December 8 – Ivan Gundulić (born 1589), Croatian Baroque poet
 c. December? – John Day (born 1574), English playwright and poet
 Daulat Qazi (born 1600), Bengali poet

See also

 Poetry
 17th century in poetry
 17th century in literature

Notes

17th-century poetry
Poetry